Muhammad Abduh Lestaluhu (born 16 October 1993) is an Indonesian professional footballer who plays as a left back for Liga 1 club Persis Solo. He lives in Ternate and his childhood friend is Persib Bandung player, Ardi Idrus. His uncle, Ramdani Lestaluhu is also a football player. He is also a First Sergeant in the Indonesian Army for Military Police Corps unit.

Club career

Persis Solo
Born in Tulehu, Abduh made his first career in 2011, then Abduh decided to joined Persis Solo was then coached by Junaedi, he said "Exactly to be my first pro team in Indonesia". Together with Persis Solo, he has played 14 times with a score of 1 goal.

Persija Jakarta
In 2012, Abduh officially signed a contract with Persija Jakarta, not only himself, other players followed to join, such as Feri Komul, Gustavo López, Daryono, Barkah Crustian, and Anindito Wahyu. Abduh made his Persija debut in a 1–1 draw against Persisam Samarinda on 6 January 2013 as a substitute for Defri Rizki in the 87th minute. During his career at Persija, He made only 7 league appearances for Persija Jakarta.

PS TNI / Persikabo 1973
In 2015, The sanctions that hit Indonesian football made Abduh's career at Persija hampered because the competition was officially stopped, he then started his career as a member of the Indonesian National Armed Forces (TNI). After undergoing a series of tests, feasibility tests, and training materials which he had been doing for 5 months, Abduh was finally accepted as a member of the TNI with the rank of second sergeant (serda) at the end of 2015.

At that time, TNI built a football club. Abduh's background made it quite easy for him to penetrate the team. He eventually joined the club in the 2016 Jenderal Sudirman Cup and 2016 Indonesia Soccer Championship A.

Abduh made his first official league debut on 22 April 2017, coming on as a starter in a 2–2 draw with Persib Bandung at the Pakansari Stadium, Bogor. Abduh scored his first career Indonesian Liga 1 goal in a 1–2 loss over Bali United on 15 August 2019.

Return to Persis Solo
On 18 June 2021, Persis Solo announces 38th new recruit. Abduh officially signed a contract with the team and became part of the squad to play in 2021–22 season, this is an opportunity for him to return to his old club. Abduh made his first league debut on 26 September 2021, coming on as a starter in a 2–0 win with PSG Pati at the Manahan Stadium, Surakarta. On 26 October, Abduh scored his first goal for Persis against PSCS Cilacap in the 66th minute at the Manahan Stadium.

Bali United (loan)
In January 2022, Abduh signed a contract with Liga 1 club Bali United on loan from Persis Solo. He made his league debut in a 2–0 win against Persita Tangerang on 17 January 2022 as a substitute for Leonard Tupamahu in the 70th minute at the Ngurah Rai Stadium, Denpasar.

International career 
He received a red card in the 2nd leg of 2016 AFF Championship Final at the 90th minute near the end of the match because of kicking the ball to Thai bench as a sign of protest for what he perceive for their uncooperative when one of the Thai officials in the bench denying to give him the ball in the way seen by him as "an act of delaying the time". Shortly after he being sent off, he was seen showing his middle finger to Thai fans.

Career statistics

Club

International appearances

International goals 
Scores and results list the Indonesia's goal tally first.
Indonesia U-23

Personal life 
Lestaluhu is the twin brother of Rafid Lestaluhu, he also has an older brother Ramdani Lestaluhu, and a younger brother Pandi Lestaluhu, who are also professional footballers and former teammates of his at Persija Jakarta.

Honours

Club
Persis Solo
 Liga 2: 2021

Bali United
 Liga 1: 2021–22

International
Indonesia
AFF Championship runner-up: 2016

Individual
 Liga 2 Best XI: 2021

References

External links 
 
 

1993 births
Living people
People from Tulehu
Indonesian Muslims
Indonesian footballers
Liga 1 (Indonesia) players
Liga 2 (Indonesia) players
Indonesian Premier Division players
Persis Solo players
Persija Jakarta players
Persikabo 1973 players
Bali United F.C. players
Indonesia youth international footballers
Indonesia international footballers
Sportspeople from Maluku (province)
Association football wingers
Association football fullbacks